Desertserges is a civil parish in County Cork, Ireland. It is also an Ecclesiastical parish in the Roman Catholic Diocese of Cork and Ross. The parish lies between the towns of Enniskean and Bandon. Most of the area is hilly, rising from 60 to 230 meters. The fertility of the land is varied with some fertile areas as well as barren uplands.

History 
It is believed that the site at Desertserges may well have been sacred before the arrival of Christianity in Ireland. Looked at from the air the graveyard is fairly circular in shape, which is often an indication of pre-Christian antiquity. The early Christians often adopted sites that were already sacred.

The name of the parish comes from a hermit, named Serges who made his home somewhere in the parish. The Irish word "Díseart Seargus" literally means "the hermitage of Serges". There was a Celtic Christian monastic Community at nearby Kinneigh which is believed to have been founded by St. Colman between 617 and 619 CE. It is likely that Serges was a part of that community even though he would have spent much time in solitude. Desertserges was a half day's walk away from Kinneigh through the scrub and woods that grew in this area at that time, and across the river Bandon. It is not known for certain exactly where the hermitage of Serges was – some historians say it was a few meters east of the present church and that is probably where the original church stood. The present church (St. Mary's) was built in 1805.

Prior to the 12th century, Desertserges was one of seven parishes which comprised a diocese of Kinneigh. In 1199 it was included in new diocese of Cork by papal decree.

In Lewis' Topographical Dictionary of Ireland, published in 1837, Desertserges is described as containing 6,629 inhabitants.

Today 
Today, Desertserges remains a rural parish. There is one primary school, Desertserges National School, with about 24 children.

Agriculture remains the dominant local industry.

People 
Economist Samuel Mountifort Longfield was a native of Desertserges.

Townlands 

 Aghyohil Beg
 Aghyohil More
 Ardkitt East
 Ardkitt West
 Ballinard
 Ballyvoige
 Breaghna
 Boulteen
 Cappaknockane
 Castlederry
 Carhoovauler
 Carrigroe
 Cashel Beg
 Cashel Commons
 Cashelmore
 Crohane East
 Crohane West
 Currane
 Dangan More
 Derry
 Derrymeeleen
 Drombofinny
 Farrannasheshery
 Garranelahan
 Garranes
 Kilbeloge
 Kilcolman
 Kilcolmanpark
 Killeen
 Kilnameela
 Kilrush
 Kill South
 Kilmoylerane South
 Kilmoylerane North
 Knockacullen
 Knockmacool
 Knocknanuss
 Knocknagallagh
 Knocknastooka
 Knocks
 Lisbehegh
 Lisnacunna
 Maulbrack East
 Maulbrack West
 Maulnarouga South
 Maulnarouga North
 Maulrour
 Moneens
 Tullymurrihy

References

External links 
 https://web.archive.org/web/20110721125109/http://kinneighunion.ie/

Civil parishes of County Cork